The Callan Hotel is an historic structure located at 502 5th Avenue in San Diego's Gaslamp Quarter, in the U.S. state of California. It was built in 1878.

History

The building was erected by property owner William Llewelyn following a fire that had destroyed a previous building. Saloon owner Tillman Burns operated a menagerie to attract customers.

The Nippon Corporation, an import business, purchased the building in 1926. The ground floor served as a sales outlet while the upstairs operated as the Hotel Pacific. Here Japanese clients rented furnished rooms and office space. The Japanese Association of San Diego County kept their headquarters at the Hotel Pacific.

In 1941, all President Franklin D. Roosevelt signed Executive Order 9066, sending all Japanese to internment camps. The San Diego Savings and Loan Company took possession of the Hotel Pacific and renamed it the Hotel Callan.

See also
 List of Gaslamp Quarter historic buildings

References

External links

 

1878 establishments in California
Buildings and structures in San Diego
Commercial buildings completed in 1878
Gaslamp Quarter, San Diego